Penal transportation to Australia began with the arrival of the First Fleet in 1788 and ended in 1868. Overall, approximately 165,000 convicts were transported to Australia.

Convicts

A

 Esther Abrahams (c. 1767–1846), English wife of George Johnston, transported to New South Wales in 1788 for theft

B

 Charlotte Badger (c. 1788–1816), transported to New South Wales in 1801 for theft
 Joseph Backler (1813–1895), English artist, transported to New South Wales in 1832 for forgery
 William Bannon (1826–1904), Irish soldier, transported to Van Diemen's Land in 1849 for theft
 George Barrington (1755–1804), Irish author and socialite, transported to New South Wales in 1788 for pickpocketing
 Thomas Barrett (c. 1754–1788), English artist, transported to New South Wales in 1788 for mutiny
 John Baughan (1754–1797), English carpenter, transported to New South Wales in 1788 for theft
 Sarah Bellamy (1770–1843), English maid, servant and weaver, transported to New South Wales for theft
 Andrew Bent (1790–1851), English printer and publisher, transported to New South Wales for burglary
 James Blackburn (1803–1854), English architect and engineer, transported to Van Diemen's Land for forgery
 William Bland (1789–1868), English politician and inventor, transported to Van Diemen's Land for manslaughter
 Solomon Blay (1816–1897), English hangman, transported to Van Diemen's Land for forgery
 James Bloodsworth (1759–1804), English builder, transported to New South Wales for theft
 Billy Blue (c. 1767–1834), Jamaican boatman, transported to New South Wales for theft
 Thomas Bock (1790–1855), English artist, transported to Van Diemen's Land for administering drugs to a young woman
 Ruth Bowyer (c. 1761–1788), English First Fleeter, transported to New South Wales for theft
 Matthew Brady (1799–1826), English bushranger, transported to Van Diemen's Land for theft
 Richard Browne (1776–1824), Irish artist, transported to New South Wales for forgery
 Mary Bryant (1765–?), Cornish escapee, transported to New South Wales for highway robbery
 William Bryant (c. 1757–1791), Cornish escapee, transported to New South Wales for impersonating a Royal Navy seaman
 William Buckley (1780–1856), English escapee, transported to New South Wales for possessing a roll of stolen cloth
 Knud Bull (1811–1889), Norwegian artist, transported to Van Diemen's Land for forgery
 Richard Burgess (1829–1866), English bushranger, transported to New South Wales for highway robbery
 Robert Francis Burns (1840–1883), Irish murderer, transported to Western Australia for theft

C

 John Cadman (1772–1848), English publican, transported to New South Wales for horse theft
 John Caesar (c. 1763–1796), Madagascan or West Indian bushranger, transported to New South Wales for theft
 Elizabeth Callaghan (1802–1852), Irish wife of explorer John Batman, transported to New South Wales for forgery
 John Casey (?–1882), Irish rebel, transported to New South Wales for insurrection
 Martin Cash (1808–1877), Irish bushranger, transported to New South Wales for shooting at a man
 Denis Cashman (1842–1897), Irish Fenian, transported to Western Australia for treason
 Margaret Catchpole (1762–1819), English adventuress and chronicler, transported to New South Wales for horse theft
 Alfred Chopin (1846–1902), English photographer, transported to Western Australia for receiving stolen goods
 William Clackson (c. 1799–?), Scottish shoemaker and activist, transported to New South Wales for his role in the Radical War
 Daniel Connor (1831–1898), Irish businessman and politician, transported to Western Australia in 1853 for sheep stealing
 Daniel Cooper (1785–1853), English businessman, transported to New South Wales for theft
 William Cuffay (1788–1870), English Chartist leader, transported to Van Diemen's Land for sedition and "levying war" against Queen Victoria

D

 David Davies (1812–1874), Welsh poet and rebel, transported to Van Diemen's Land for his role in the Rebecca Riots
 Edward Davis (1816–1841), Jewish bushranger, transported to New South Wales for theft
 James Davis (1808–1889), Scottish escapee, transported to New South Wales for theft
 John Davies (1813–1872), English journalist and newspaper proprietor, transported to Van Diemen's Land in 1830 for receiving stolen goods
 Ann Dinham (1827–1882), English innkeeper, transported to Van Diemen's Land for theft
 Fr James Dixon (1758–1840), Irish priest, transported to New South Wales in 1800 for his role in the Irish Rebellion of 1798
 Jack Donahue (1804–1830), Irish bushranger, transported to New South Wales for intent to commit a felony
 Aimable Duperouzel (1831–1901), French farmer, transported to Western Australia for robbery

E

 Edward Eagar (1787–1866), Irish lawyer and merchant, transported to New South Wales for forgery
 Edmund Edgar (1804–1854), English artist, transported to New South Wales in 1826 for theft
 Ralph Entwistle (c. 1805–1830), English bushranger and leader of the Bathurst rebellion, transported to New South Wales for theft
 John Eyre (1771–?), English artist, transported to New South Wales for housebreaking

F

 Gilburri (1814–1902), Irish Fenian, transported to New South Wales in 1838 for desertion
 Thomas McCarthy Fennell (1841–1914), Irish Fenian, transported to Western Australia in 1868 for treason
 William Field (1774–1837), English businessman, transported to New  for receiving stolen goods
 John Frost (1784–1877), Welsh Chartist, transported to Van Diemen's Land for his role in the Newport Rising
 Henry Fulton (1761–1840), Irish clergyman and schoolmaster, transported to New South Wales for his role in the Irish Rebellion of 1798

G

 Henry Beresford Garrett (c. 1818–1885), English bushranger, transported to Norfolk Island for assault
 Joseph Gerrald (1763–1796), West Indian-born political reformer, transported to New South Wales for sedition
 James Goodwin (c. 1800–c. 1835), English escapee and explorer, transported to Van Diemen's Land for theft
 John Guard (c. 1791–1857), English whaler, transported to New South Wales for theft
 William Buelow Gould (1801–1853), English artist, transported to Van Diemen's Land for theft
 Francis Greenway (1777–1837), English architect, transported to New South Wales for forgery
 William Henry Groom (1833–1901), English politician, transported to New South Wales for embezzlement

H

 Laurence Hynes Halloran (1765–1831), Irish poet and schoolmaster, transported to New South Wales for forgery
 Dorothy Handland (1706–?), English rag dealer, transported to New South Wales for perjury
 Henry Browne Hayes (1762–1832), Irish knight and adventurer, transported to New South Wales for kidnapping
 Daniel Herbert (1802–1868), English artist and stonemason, transported to Van Diemen's Land for highway robbery
 Joseph Holt (1756–1826), Irish farmer and rebel leader, transported to New South Wales for his role in the Irish Rebellion of 1798
 William Horton (1817–1864), English publican, transported to New South Wales for larceny of a coat
 George Howe (1769–1821), English poet and printer, transported to New South Wales for shoplifting
 Michael Howe (1787–1818), English bushranger, transported to Van Diemen's Land for highway robbery
 Ralph Hush (1779–1860), English farmer, transported to New South Wales for theft
 William Hutchinson (1772–1846), English businessman, transported to New South Wales for theft
 Mary Hyde (1779–1864), English businesswoman, transported to New South Wales for theft

J

 Mark Jeffrey (1825–1903), English criminal, transported to New South Wales for burglary
 Joseph Bolitho Johns (c. 1826–1900), English bushranger, also known as Moondyne Joe, transported to Western Australia for theft
 George Jones (c. 1815–1844), English bushranger, transported to Van Diemen's Land for theft
 William Jones (1809–1873), Welsh Chartist, transported to Van Diemen's Land for his role in the Newport Rising
 Jørgen Jørgensen (1780–1841), Danish adventurer, transported to Van Diemen's Land for theft

K

 Henry Kable (1763–1846), English businessman, transported to New South Wales for theft
 Lawrence Kavenagh (c. 1805–1846), Irish bushranger, transported to Van Diemen's Land for burglary
 John Knatchbull (c. 1791–1844), English naval captain, transported to New South Wales for theft

L

 Solomon Levey (1794–1833), English merchant, transported to New South Wales for theft
 Simeon Lord (1771–1840), English businessman, transported to New South Wales for theft
George Loveless (1797–1874), English labourer, transported to New South Wales as one of the Tolpuddle Martyrs
 Nathaniel Lucas (1764–1818), English carpenter, transported to New South Wales for theft
 Joseph Lycett (1774–c. 1825), English artist, transported to New South Wales for forgery
 John Lynch (1813–1842), Irish serial killer, transported to New South Wales for false pretense
 Samuel Lyons (1791–1851), English businessman, transported to New South Wales for theft

M

 Francis MacNamara c. 1810–1861), Irish poet, also known as Frank the Poet, transported to Van Diemen's Land for larceny
 John Martin (1812–1875), Irish nationalist, transported to Van Diemen's Land for sedition
 Terence MacManus (1811–1861), Irish nationalist, transported to Van Diemen's Land for treason
 Maurice Margarot (1745–1815), English political reformer, transported to New South Wales for sedition
 Valentine Marshall (1814–1874), English farmer, transported to Van Diemen's Land for his role in the Reform Act Riots
 Thomas Francis Meagher (1823–1867), Irish nationalist, transported to Van Diemen's Land for treason
 George Mealmaker (1768–1808), Scottish political reformer, transported to New South Wales for sedition
 James Meehan (1774–1826), Irish surveyor, transported to New South Wales in 1800 for his role in the Irish Rebellion of 1798
 John Mitchel (1815–1875), Irish nationalist and author, transported to Van Diemen's Land for treason
 Enoch Moore (1779–1841), Canadian rebel, transported to Van Diemen's Land for his role in the Rebellions of 1837
 Molly Morgan (1762–1835), English landowner, transported to New South Wales for theft and arson
 Thomas Muir (1765–1799), Scottish political reformer and escapee, transported to New South Wales for sedition

N

 Isaac Nichols (1770–1819), English businessman and postman, transported to New South Wales for theft

O

 William Smith O'Brien (1803–1864), Irish nationalist, transported to Van Diemen's Land for treason
 Kevin Izod O'Doherty (1823–1905), Irish nationalist, transported to Van Diemen's Land for treason
 Patrick O'Donoghue (–1854), Irish nationalist, transported to Van Diemen's Land for treason
 Cornelius O'Mahony (1840–1879), Irish scholar and Fenian, transported to Western Australia in 1868 for his role in the Fenian Rising
 John Boyle O'Reilly (1844–1890), Irish Fenian, poet and author, transported to Western Australia for his role in the Fenian Rising
 James Oatley (c. 1769–1839), English watchmaker, transported to New South Wales for theft

P

 Thomas Fyshe Palmer (1747–1802), English political reformer, transported to New South Wales for sedition
 Thomas Pamphlett (c. 1788–1838), English castaway, transported to New South Wales for theft
 Robert Pate (1819–1895), English army officer, transported to Van Diemen's Land for attacking Queen Victoria
 Alexander Pearce (1790–1824), Irish escapee and cannibal, transported to Van Diemen's Land for theft
 Joseph Potaski (1764–1824), Polish soldier, transported to Van Diemen's Land for theft
 Elizabeth Pulley (1762–1837), English servant, transported to New South Wales in 1788 for burglary

R

 Elizabeth Read (c. 1820–1884), English prostitute, transported to Van Diemen's Land in 1841 for theft
 Richard Read Sr. (c. 1765–c. 1829), English artist, transported to New South Wales for possessing forged banknotes
 William Redfern (1774–1833), English surgeon, transported to New South Wales for mutiny
 Leopold Redpath (1816–1891), English clerk, transported to Western Australia for fraud
 Mary Reibey (1777–1855), English businesswoman, transported to New South Wales in 1792 for horse theft
 John Richardson (c. 1797–1882), English explorer and botanist, transported to New South Wales for larceny
 Hannah Rigby (c. 1794–1853), English embroiderer, transported multiple times for theft
 Michael Massey Robinson (1744–1826), English poet, transported to New South Wales for extortion
 Charles Rodius (1802–1860), German artist, transported to New South Wales for theft
 Anthony Rope (1756–1843), Norfolk farmer, transported on First Fleet to New South Wales for theft
 James Ruse (c. 1759–1837), Cornish farmer, transported to New South Wales for housebreaking

S

 Joseph Samuel (c. 1780–1806), English escapee, transported to Van Diemen's Land for robbery
 Henry Savery (1791–1842), English novelist, transported to Van Diemen's Land for forgery
 Shoni Sguborfawr (1811–1858), Welsh rebel, transported to Norfolk Island for his role in the Rebecca Riots
 Robert Sidaway (1758–1809), English philanthropist, transported to New South Wales for theft
 William Skirving (c. 1745–1796), Scottish political reformer, transported to New South Wales for sedition
 Emanuel Solomon (1800–1873), English businessman and politician, transported to New South Wales for larceny
 Ikey Solomon (c. 1787–1850), English criminal, transported to Van Diemen's Land for receiving stolen goods
 Vaiben Solomon (1798–1860), English businessman and politician, transported to New South Wales for larceny
 James Squire (1754–1822), English brewer, transported to New South Wales for highway robbery
 Elizabeth Steel (c. 1760–1795), English deaf person, transported to New South Wales for theft
 Owen Suffolk (1829–?), English poet and bushranger, transported to New South Wales for forgery

T

 John Tawell (1784–1845), English chemist and murderer, transported to New South Wales for forgery
 Robert Taylor (1792–1850), English businessman, transported to New South Wales for larceny
 Hohepa Te Umuroa (c. 1820s–1847), Maori warrior, transported to Van Diemen's Land for his role in the New Zealand Wars
 Samuel Terry (c. 1776–1838), English philanthropist, transported to New South Wales for theft
 Andrew Thompson (c. 1773–1810), Scottish farmer, magistrate, transported to New South Wales for theft
 William Tucker (c. 1784–1817), English sealer, transported to New South Wales for theft

U
 James Underwood (1771–1844) English shipbuilder, distiller and merchant, transported to New South Wales in 1790

V

 James Hardy Vaux (1782–?), English author and serial thief, transported to New South Wales on three separate occasions

W

 Thomas Griffiths Wainewright (1794–1847), English artist, journalist and alleged serial killer, transported to Van Diemen's Land for forgery
 James Walsh ( 1833–1871), English artist, transported to Western Australia for theft and forgery
 Thomas Watling (1762–c. 1814), Scottish artist, transported to New South Wales for forgery
 William Westwood (c. 1830–1846), English bushranger and leader of the Cooking Pot Uprising, transported to New South Wales for stealing a coat
 Joseph Wild (c. 1759–1847), English explorer, transported to New South Wales for burglary
 Henry Wildman (1838–?), English explorer, transported to Western Australia for burglary
 John Williams (c. 1820–?), English boatman, transported to Van Diemen's Land in 1852 for theft
 Zephaniah Williams (1795–1874), Welsh Chartist, transported to Van Diemen's Land for his role in the Newport Rising
 James Wilson (1836–1921), Irish Fenian, transported to Western Australia for desertion and mutiny
 Solomon Wiseman (1777–1838), English merchant and ferryman, transported to New South Wales for theft

See also
 List of convicts on the First Fleet

References

External links 
 Convict Records

List
 
Lists of criminals
Australian crime-related lists